Kim Rosen may refer to:

 Kim Rosen (mastering engineer), audio engineer
 Kimberley Rosen, state senator in Maine, United States